The 2002 ARFU Asian Rugby Championship was the 18th  edition of the tournament, and was played in Bangkok. The 11 teams were divided into two divisions.

Tournament

First Division

Second Division

Pool 1

Pool 2

Finals

5th place final

Third Place Final

First Place final

References

2002
2002 rugby union tournaments for national teams
International rugby union competitions hosted by Thailand
rugby union
2002 in Asian rugby union